Hoot may refer to:

Publications
 Hoot (novel), a young adult novel by Carl Hiaasen
 Hoot, a 1996 children's novel by Jane Hissey
 Hoot (comics), a British magazine published from 1985 to 1986
 The Brandeis Hoot, a student newspaper at Brandeis University

Film and TV
 Hoot (film), a 2006 film based on the Carl Hiaasen novel
 Hoots the Owl, a Sesame Street Muppet
 Hoot an Owl character on the Australian children's television show Giggle and Hoot

Music
 Hoot (EP), a 2010 mini-album by South Korean girl group Girls' Generation
"Hoot" (song), a song by Girls' Generation from the mini-album

As a nickname
 Hoot Evers (1921–1991), American Major League Baseball player
 Hoot Gibson (disambiguation), various people
 Hoot Hester (1951–2016), American country and bluegrass musician
 Hoot Sackett, American baseball head coach at Oklahoma State University in 1920–1921

Other uses
 Hoot, Texas, United States, an unincorporated community
 Hoot (torpedo), an Iranian weapon in service since 2006
 Heart of Ohio Tole (HOOT) a regional chapter of the Society of Decorative Painters

Lists of people by nickname